James A. Jacobson is a United States Air Force lieutenant general who serves as the deputy commander of the Pacific Air Forces since August 2021. He most recently served as the director of training and readiness of the U.S. Air Force. Previously, he was the commander of the Air Force District of Washington.

In July 2021, he was nominated and confirmed for promotion to lieutenant general and assigned as deputy commander of the Pacific Air Forces. His promotion became effective on August 20, 2021.

Effective dates of promotions

References

External links

Year of birth missing (living people)
Living people
Place of birth missing (living people)
United States Air Force generals